Glenea johnstoni is a species of beetle in the family Cerambycidae. It was described by Charles Joseph Gahan in 1902. It is known from Uganda, Cameroon, and the Democratic Republic of the Congo.

Subspecies
 Glenea johnstoni germaini Breuning, 1965
 Glenea johnstoni johnstoni Gahan, 1902

References

johnstoni
Beetles described in 1902